Gerda Annika Linde (born 26 February 1948) is a Swedish physician, virologist and retired civil servant. From 2005 to 2013 she served as State Epidemiologist at the Swedish Institute for Communicable Disease Control.

Biography 
Linde was born in Skövde and grew up there. She was inspired by the novel Exodus by Leon Uris to study medicine. She enrolled at Gothenburg University in 1968, studying medicine and sociology, obtaining a medical degree in 1974. After her internship at Danderyd Hospital she went on to work as an infectious disease specialist at the presently defunct Roslagstull Hospital in Stockholm. In 1979 she started working at the virological department at the Swedish National Bacteriological Laboratory, and completed her PhD in Clinical Virology in 1987. In 1993 she became head of the Swedish influenza centre of the WHO and started working for Department of Virology at the Swedish Institute for Communicable Disease Control, where she in 2002 became department head. In 2005 she became head of the Department of Epidemiology and was in the same year appointed State Epidemiologist. She served in this role until her retirement in 2013, when she was succeeded by Anders Tegnell.

Linde's research is mainly focused on adapting basic research results to clinical applications. She has researched the reaction of the human body to different types of viruses and evaluation of diagnostic methods. She mainly focused on herpes viruses to begin with, but eventually came to focus her work mostly on influenza and respiratory viruses. She has published more than 200 peer-reviewed scientific papers.

Linde has served as adjunct professor at the Karolinska Institute. She hosted an episode of the popular radio show Sommar i P1 for Sveriges Radio in 2010.

References 

Swedish epidemiologists
Swedish virologists
1948 births
Living people
People from Skövde Municipality
Swedish civil servants
Academic staff of the Karolinska Institute
Sommar (radio program) hosts
Swedish women radio presenters
Swedish women physicians